Bukowa Góra may refer to the following places:
Bukowa Góra, Chojnice County in Pomeranian Voivodeship (north Poland)
Bukowa Góra, Gmina Kartuzy in Pomeranian Voivodeship (north Poland)
Bukowa Góra, West Pomeranian Voivodeship (north-west Poland)
Bukowa Góra, Gmina Sulęczyno in Pomeranian Voivodeship (north Poland)
Bukowa Góra, Warmian-Masurian Voivodeship (north Poland)
Bukowa Góra, Świętokrzyskie Mountains, a mountain in the Świętokrzyskie Mountains of south central Poland